In the 2009–10 season of competitive football (soccer) in Cape Verde: The 3rd Cape Verdean Cup took place that year.

Diary of the season
Brava Island Cup and Super Cup held their first editions
Taça da Ilha do Maio or Taça Djarmai and the Super-Taça da Ilha do Maio or Super-Taça Djarmai was established
March 13: Juventude da Furna football (soccer) club established in Brava
Sporting Clube da Boa Vista won their only title for Boa Vista
SC Morabeza won their 5th and recent title for Brava
Botafogo FC won their 17th and recent title for Fogo
Barreirense won their 2nd and recent title for Maio
Académico do Aeroporto won their 10th title for Sal
Scorpion Vermelho won their 3rd title for Santiago North
Sporting Clube da Praia won their  title for Santiago South
Solpontense won their 4th and recent title (6th overall for Santo Antão) for Santo Antão North
Marítimo do Porto Novo won their 2nd and recent title for Santo Antão South
Desportivo Ribeira Brava won their 4th and recent title for São Nicolau
Batuque FC won their 3rd title for São Vicente
Académica do Sal won their second and recent cup title for Sal
May 8: 2010 Cape Verdean Football Championships began
May 15: Sporting Praia defeated Ribeira Brava 2-7 and made it the highest scoring match and the largest goal difference until May 30
May 30: Boavista defeated Solpontense 7-1 which made it the season's highest scoring match
June 5: Regular season ends
June 20: Knockout stage begins
July 3: Championship finals begins
July 11: Boavista FC won their 3rd and recent national championship title

Final standings

Cape Verdean Football Championships

Batuque and Académico do Aeroporto were first in each group, second place Group A club Boavista advanced with 8 points and second place Group B club Sporting Praia advanced with 11 points and scored the most with 16 goals, Boavista was second with 15 goals.  Sporting advanced to the finals with 2 goals scored while Boavista advanced with a goal scored away in the second match. Boavista defeated Sporting 2-0 in the first match and 0-1 in the final match and Boavista went to win their 3rd and recent title.

Group A

Group B

Final Stages

Leading goalscorer: Fufura - 5 goals

Cape Verdean Cup
The third Cape Verdean Cup took place.  Boavista Praia won their 2nd and recent cup title after being winner in the final round after defeating in two matches with the most goals scored.

Participants
Sport Sal Rei Club, winner of the Boa Vista Island Cup
Botafogo, winner of the Fogo Island Cup
Barreirense, winner of the Maio Island Cup
Juventude, winner of the Sal Island Cup
No participant from the Santiago North Zone
Boavista Praia, winner of the Santiago South Zone Cup
Solpontense, winner of the Santo Antão North Cup
Marítimo Porto Novo, winner of the Santo Antão South Cup
Talho, winner of the São Nicolau Cup
Batuque, winner of the São Vicente Cup

Island or regional competitions

Regional Championships

Regional Cups

Regional Super Cups
The 2009 champion winner played with a 2009 cup winner (when a club won both, a second place club from the regional cup competed).

Regional Opening Tournaments

Transfer deals

Summer-Fall transfer window
The September/October transfer window runs from the end of the previous season in September up to October.
 Aires Marques from CS Mindelense to  Sertanense F.C.
 Babanco from Boavista Praia to  Arouca
 Caló from  al-Shamaal Qatar to SC Santa Maria
 Figo from Amabox Barcelona Tarrafal to Sporting Clube da Praia
 Rambé from CS Mindelense to  Macedo de Cavaleiros
 Rody from SC Santa Maria to  FC Porto
 Sténio from Académica do Mindelo to CS Mindelense
 Tom Tavares from Sporting Praia to  Anadia

See also
2009 in Cape Verde
2010 in Cape Verde
Timeline of Cape Verdean football

References

 
 
2009 in association football
2010 in association football